Mammad Said Ordubadi (24 March 1872, Ordubad - 1 May 1950, Baku) was  Azerbaijani writer, poet, playwright and journalist. 

Ordubadi, started his career as a poet. His articles and poetry were published in many of the magazines in Azerbaijani language at that time. During the Iranian Constitutional Revolution, Ordubadi joined Muslim Social Democratic Party (Hummet). He then published Bloody Years about the clashes between Armenian and Azerbaijani populations in 1905. In 1918, he joined to Communist Party and his articles have published in the official newspaper of Hummet organization. He, along with XI Red Army, goes to Dagestan and publishes Red Dagestan magazine there. After the Sovietization of Azerbaijan he returns to Baku.

Today, Ordubadi is remembered as one of the most important intellectuals of Azerbaijan during Soviet era. He served twice as a deputy of the Supreme Soviet of the Azerbaijan SSR, the highest legislative institution in the country. His novels include Sword and the Pen, about the personality of Nizami Ganjavi, Foggy Tabriz about the Iranian constitutional revolution, also Mysterious Baku and Fighting City which both are about the revolutionary activities of Bolsheviks and 26 Baku Commissars. He also published articles about Narimanovism about the activity of national communism symbol in Azerbaijan, Nariman Narimanov.

Biography

Early life
He was initially educated at religious school, medrese, and later studied at Mahammad Sidgi's secular school "Əxtər" (Star). Mahammad Sidgi was well-known intellectual for his enlightenment activity in Russian Azerbaijan and the rest of Caucasus in the beginning of the 20th century. 

Mammed Said lost his father at early age and had to work in a textile factory.

Works
He started writing in the 1890s. His first writing was published in Tbilisi (then Tiflis) in a newspaper "Shargi-Rus" (Oriental Russia) in 1903. In his early publications Ordubadi criticised ignorance, backwardness and religious fanaticism. In 1906 in Tbilisi he published his poetry book "Qəflət" (Ignorance) and in 1907 "Vətən və hürriyyət" (Fatherland and Freedom). He wrote for several Azerbaijani publications, including "Molla Nasraddin", "Irshad", "Sada" and others. Ordubadi covered various political, social and educational issues. He firmly stood for the necessity of the enlightenment of the Azerbaijani society under the Russian rule. In 1911, Ordubadi published a book "Qanlı sənələr" (Bloody years) - collection of first hand accounts of the Armenian-Tatar massacres in 1905-1906. In the 1910s, Ordubadi published several plays, stories and novels. In 1915, Russian authorities arrested him and exiled to Tsaritsyn. In 1918, he joined the Communist Party and returned to Baku in May 1920, after the Bolshevik conquest of Azerbaijan. 

Ordubadi became the editor-in-chief of "Əxbar", "Yeni yol", "Molla Nasraddin". 

During the Soviet period, Ordubadi wrote extensively novels, satiric stories, plays, librettos (to operas - "Koroğlu", "Nərgiz", "Nizami"). His famous works include "Dumanlı Təbriz" (Foggy Tabriz) (1933–1948) and "Qılınc və qələm" (Sword and Quill) (1946–1948). He wrote novels about  poets and writers - Nizami Ganjavi, Fuzûlî, Molla Panah Vagif, Mirza Alakbar Sabir.

External links

 Ordubadi's "Bloody Years" in Russian

Azerbaijani poets
Azerbaijani dramatists and playwrights
Azerbaijani journalists
1872 births
1950 deaths
Azerbaijani communists
Soviet Azerbaijani people
20th-century Azerbaijani people
20th-century Azerbaijani poets
20th-century Azerbaijani dramatists and playwrights
People from Ordubad
Honored Art Workers of the Azerbaijan SSR